Muni Mohjit Vijayji(14 October 1944 – 2 September 2000) born as Mahendra Kumar Mota,, Jain ascetic of Swetamber tradition was a disciple of Acharya Ramchandrasuri and was initiated in monkhood on 29 April 1979 along with his younger brother Navinkumar (Renowned as Jainacharya Yugbhushan Surishwarji). Both brothers are widely known as 'Mota Pandit Maharaj Saheb' and 'Nana Pandit Maharaj Saheb' respectively in view of their expertise in Jain scriptures.

Life 
Muni Mohjit Vijayji, as a spiritual leader of Swetamber Jain tradition, had contributed to the book That Which Is, known as the Tattvartha Sutra to Jains. Book is recognized by all four Jaina traditions as the earliest, most authoritative and comprehensive summary of Jain religion.

Recognition 
He was widely acclaimed as “Powerhouse of knowledge” by The Times of India.

References 

1944 births
2000 deaths
Jain monks
20th-century Indian Jains
Śvētāmbara monks
Indian religious leaders